KNIR "Radio Maria" (for: New IbeRia) is an AM broadcasting station at 1360 kHz on the AM band licensed to New Iberia, Louisiana serving the greater Lafayette area with Catholic programming as a repeater of KJMJ 580 kHz in Alexandria, Louisiana.

History
The station began broadcasting June 4, 1952, and originally held the call sign KVIM. It briefly broadcast at 1570 kHz, before moving to 1360 kHz later in 1952. It ran 1,000 watts, and broadcast during daytime hours only. On March 1, 1966, its call sign was changed to KNIR.

KNIR at one time was an AM/FM combo in New Iberia with a country music format on AM and beautiful music on FM. Radio talk show host Jeanne Sparrow once hosted a program in the evenings and weekends on KNIR. French-language programming in Cajun and Creole dialects were also aired on KNIR in addition to being an affiliate for Tulane University's sports radio network. The country format remains on the FM station (now known as KXKC a separate entity now owned by Citadel Broadcasting.)

KNIR was the first AM station to simulcast KJMJ, thus forming repeater network Radio Maria USA, the English language unit of Radio Maria Inc. based in Como, Italy. Radio Maria USA consists of originator KJMJ and nine repeater stations located in Louisiana, eastern Texas, central Pennsylvania, southern Mississippi's Gulf Coast, the Door Peninsula in eastern Wisconsin and west central Ohio.

Listeners outside KNIR's listening area can also access the Radio Maria audiostream using iPhone, BlackBerry and Android mobile phone devices by downloading the appropriate app from its website.

See also
KJMJ
KBIO
WOLM
Radio Maria

References

External links
Official Radio Maria USA site (with streaming audio)

New Iberia, Louisiana
Catholic radio stations
Iberia Parish, Louisiana
Lafayette Parish, Louisiana
Radio stations established in 1952
1952 establishments in Louisiana
Christian radio stations in Louisiana